You FM is a Sri Lankan radio channel which broadcasts in Colombo and Kandy. It was launched on 10 September 2006 as MAX Radio. It is available on 95.3 FM islandwide. It is a Sinhala medium radio and operated by MGM Networks (Pvt) Ltd.

Sinhala-language radio stations in Sri Lanka
MGM Networks
Mass media in Colombo
Mass media in Kandy